Blad Al Juma'i is a sub-district located in al-Sabrah District, Ibb Governorate, Yemen. Blad Al Juma'i had a population of 7826 according to the 2004 census.

References 

Sub-districts in As Sabrah District